The Men's giant slalom competition at the FIS Alpine World Ski Championships 2021 was held on 19 February. A qualification was held on 18 February 2021.

Results

Final
The first run was started on 19 February at 10:00, and the second run at 13:30.

Qualification
The first run was started on 18 February at 10:00, and the second run at 13:30.

References

Men's giant slalom